A plan is a set of instructions for attaining a given objective.

Plan or PLAN may also refer to:

 Planning, the organizational process of creating and maintaining a plan
 Planning (cognitive), neurological processes involved in achieving a desired goal

Plan types 
 Automated planning and scheduling, a branch of Artificial Intelligence
 Business plan
 Development plan
 Language planning
 Marketing plan
 Military plan
 Plans (drawings), used for portraying an existing place or object, or for providing instructions to build or fabricate a place or object
 Archaeological plan
 Architectural drawing
 Architectural plan
 Blueprint
 Engineering drawing
 Floor plan
 Plan view, an orthographic projection
 Plat
 Technical drawing
 Project planning
 Retirement plan
 Urban planning

Acronyms 
 PLAN (examination), a standardized test administered by ACT, Inc.
 People's Liberation Army Navy of China
 People's Liberation Army of Namibia
 Personal Localized Alerting Network, an emergency alert system that uses mobile devices
 PLANS (non-profit) (People for Legal and Non-Sectarian Schools)

Entertainment 
 Plan (film), a 2004 Bollywood film
 Plans (album), an album by the band Death Cab for Cutie
 "Plans", a song by Bloc Party from Silent Alarm (album)
 "Plans" (song), a song by Birds of Tokyo
The Plan (2015 film), a 2015 Indian Kannada film

Places 
 Planá (Tachov District) (in German: Plan), a city in West Bohemia, Czech Republic
 Planá (České Budějovice District) (in German: Plan), a village in South Bohemia, Czech Republic 
 Plan (Huesca), a place in the Spanish Provinz Huesca
 Plan (Samnaun), a village in the Swiss Gemeinde Samnaun
 Plan, Isère, commune in the Isère department, France
 Plan, Albania, a village in the Pult area

Politics 

 Plans in Mexican history, a declaration of principles announced in conjunction with a rebellion (see also pronunciamiento)

Technology 
 .plan file, a file containing user information used by the Finger protocol
 Calligra Plan, a project management application
 Plan (calendar program), for the X Window System
 PLAN (computer language) (Programming LAnguage for Nineteen-hundred), used to program ICT 1900 series computers

Other uses
 Plan (aid organisation), an international organisation that allows people to sponsor children in developing countries
 Plan (magazine), an Irish architectural publication

See also 
 Five-year plan (disambiguation)
 Four Year Plan, a series of economic reforms in Nazi Germany
 PDCA (Plan-do-check-act), a management method used in business
 Planner (disambiguation)
 The Plan (disambiguation)